The Texas Rangers Radio Network has stations in Texas, Arkansas, Louisiana and Oklahoma. The flagship station is 105.3 KRLD-FM The Fan in Dallas. When a Rangers game conflicts with other coverage on KRLD-FM, the baseball game moves to AM 1080 KRLD. Games have aired on Spanish radio stations KESS from 1991 to 2010, KZMP from 2011 to 2016, and KFLC since 2017. Games are also heard on other Spanish-language radio stations in Texas and Arkansas. Texas Rangers games currently air on the regional television network Fox Sports Southwest. Games also previously aired in Spanish on television station Canal de Teja.

Current radio broadcasters
Eric Nadel, play-by-play (since 1979; 1980–present on radio; 1979–1981 on TV)
Matt Hicks, play-by-play (since 2012)
Jared Sandler, studio host and fill-in play-by-play (mainly spring training) (since 2015)
Dave Raymond, fill-in play-by-play (since 2016)
Eleno Ornelas, Spanish play-by-play (since 2000)
Jose Guzman, Spanish color analyst (since 2015, 2004–2009 on radio, 2010–13 on TV)

Current television broadcasters
Dave Raymond, main play-by-play (since 2017); fill-in play-by-play (2016)
Tom Grieve, color analyst (since 1995) (about 120 games since 2014)
C.J. Nitkowski, color analyst and fill-in play-by-play (since 2017)
David Murphy, studio analyst (since 2017); color analyst (since 2019)
John Rhadigan, studio host (since 1996); play-by-play (April 2011–May 2011)
Mark McLemore, studio analyst (since 2010); fill-in color analyst (since 2012)
Emily Jones, field reporter (since 2013)

All-time radio broadcasters
Dave Raymond (2016–present) (fill-in play-by-play)
Jared Sandler (2015–present) (studio host and fill-in play-by-play)
Mike Peasley (2013–2014) (studio host and fill-in play-by-play)
Bryan Dolgin (2011–2012) (studio host and fill-in play-by-play)
Matt Hicks (June 2012–present) (secondary play-by-play)
Steve Busby (May 2011–June 2012) (secondary play-by-play)
Dave Barnett (2009–May 2011) (secondary play-by-play)
Victor Rojas (2004–2008) (secondary play-by-play)
Vince Cotroneo (1998–2003) (secondary play-by-play)
Scott Franzke (1997–1998); (2002–2005) (studio host; fill-in play-by-play)
Brad Sham (1995–1997) (secondary play-by-play)
Mark Holtz (1982–1994) (primary play-by-play) (deceased)
Mel Proctor (1980–1981) (secondary play-by-play)
Eric Nadel (1980–present) (analyst/fill-in play-by-play (1980–81)); (secondary play-by-play) (1982-1994); (primary play-by-play) (1995–present) *Ford C. Frick Award winner, 2014
Jon Miller (1978–1979) (primary play-by-play) *Ford C. Frick Award winner, 2010
Bill Merrill (1974–1981) (secondary play-by-play)
Dick Risenhoover (1973–1977) (secondary play-by-play (1973); (primary play-by-play) (1974–77))
Don Drysdale (1972) (secondary play-by-play)
Bill Mercer (1972–1973) (primary play-by-play)

All-time TV broadcasters
David Murphy (2019–present) (color analyst)
C.J. Nitkowski (2017–present) (color analyst; fill-in-play-by-play)
Dave Raymond (2016–present) (play-by-play)
Steve Busby (2012–2016) (play-by-play); (2016) (analyst); (1997–mid-2011) (studio host/analyst); (1990–94) (primary TV play-by-play); (1982–1989, 1995) (secondary TV play-by-play and analyst)
Mark McLemore (2012–present) (fill-in color analyst)
John Rhadigan (March 2011–May 2011) (play-by-play)
Jim Knox (2011-2016) (field reporter)
Josh Lewin (2002-2010) (play-by-play)
Bill Land (2002-2009) (field reporter)
Bill Jones (May 1997 – 2001) (play-by-play)
Tom Grieve (1995–present) (color analyst; fill-in play-by-play)
Norm Hitzges (1981; 1986–1989; 1991–1994) (color analyst)
Jim Sundberg (1990–1995) (color analyst)
Brad Sham (1990) (play-by-play)
Dave Barnett (1990; 2011–June 2012) (play-by-play)
Greg Lucas (1989–1994) (play-by-play)
Bob Carpenter (1986–89) (play-by-play)
Freddie Patek (1985) (color analyst)
Phil Stone (1985) (play-by-play)
Merle Harmon (1982–89) (play-by-play) (deceased)
Mark Holtz (1981; 1984; 1995-May 1997) (play-by-play) (deceased)
Mel Proctor (1980–81) (play-by-play)
Eric Nadel (1979–81, 1984) (color analyst (1979); play-by-play (1980–81)) *Ford C. Frick Award winner, 2014
Frank Glieber (1978–80) (play-by-play) (deceased)
Jon Miller (1978–79) (play-by-play) *Ford C. Frick Award winner, 2010
Tom Vandergriff (1975–77) (color analyst; play-by-play) (deceased)
Burt Hawkins (1974) (play-by-play) (deceased)
Jimmy Piersall (1974) (color analyst)
Dick Risenhoover (1973–77) (play-by-play) (deceased)
Tom Hedrick (1973) (play-by-play)
Don Drysdale (1972) (color analyst; play-by-play) (deceased)
Bill Mercer (1972) (play-by-play)

References

Texas Rangers Broadcasters History
Texas Rangers Current Broadcasters

 
Texas Rangers
broadcasters
Prime Sports
Fox Sports Networks
Bally Sports
CBS Radio Sports